Gordon Keith is an American radio host on KTCK SportsRadio 1310 AM "The Ticket" in Dallas, Texas. He has shared hosting duties with George Dunham and Craig "Junior" Miller since 1994.

In July 2017, Gordon Keith won the "DFW's Favorite Broadcaster" tournament hosted by The Dallas Morning News.

Television 
 February 2007 to January 2009 – Host and Executive Producer – WFAA presents The Gordon Keith Show on WFAA (Channel 8, Dallas, Texas)
 October 2001 to March 2003 – Feature reporter on The Mark Cuban Show on KTVT (Channel 11) and KTXA (Channel 21).
 2000 – The Ticket TV Show on KSTR
 April 1998 to September 2000 – Correspondent, Positively Texas on KTVT (Channel 11)
 1997 – Correspondent, Texas Rangers broadcasts on Fox Sports Southwest and KXTX (Channel 39)
 1996 – Feature reporter and writer, "Call It Like It Is – The Deion Sanders Show" on KDFW (Channel 4)
 1995 – Feature reporter, The Ticket on TV show on KDFI (Channel 27)

Voice 
 2000 – Voice of animated character "Chadsworth" (1 episode) in "Nana and Li'l Puss Puss" for DNA Productions
 1998 – Voice of animated character "Sydney" (9 episodes) for children's program "Jingaroo" by DNA Productions

Film 
 2003 – The role of Frank Sellers in 2003's indie feature Shtickmen.
 2009 – Cameo role in 2009's indie short "The Keith Coogan Experience"

Print 
 2012–Present columnist, Dallas Morning News
 2005 to 2011 – Humor columnist, Quick DFW, a weekly newspaper from the publishers of The Dallas Morning News
 2005 – Columnist, The Sports Page Dallas
 2000 – Author, Buff Tanner: Total Man (Orez Publishing, 2000) , a parody of the self-help motivational industry
 1999 to 2004 – Contributing Writer for the Dallas Observer
 1997 – Buzz column with Lisa Davis, Fort Worth Star-Telegram

Nestor/Keith feud
A long-running feud has existed between members of The Ticket and Nestor Aparicio, an American sports writer and radio personality. On January 30, 2009, during Super Bowl week in Tampa, Florida, while roaming the Radio Row with a wireless microphone, Keith approached Aparicio in an alleged attempt to bury the hatchet. Aparicio assaulted Keith before the scuffle was broken up by Super Bowl security. The incident was broadcast live during The Ticket's morning show.

In popular culture

The FX drama Justified makes frequent use of the names of "Ticket" personalities for supporting characters as writer/producer V.J. Boyd is a former Dallas resident and an active fan of KTCK. The sixth-season episode "Dark as a Dungeon" makes reference to Gordon Keith as Mary Steenburgen's character Katherine Hale recalls him as "beard, wouldn't shut up about Lee Harvey Oswald" and describes him as "kind of wheels off". The Gordon Keith character is unseen, a deceased mob assassin who links several other supporting characters together.

Lee Harvey Oswald obsession

Keith is a noted Lee Harvey Oswald enthusiast and revels in his actions on the day of John F. Kennedy's murder, as was noted in Justified. Keith went so far as to buy Oswald's bathtub from the estate of Oswald's wife Marina and then wrote loving words about it for his award-winning Dallas Morning News column. Keith also participated in an international debate versus noted sports writer Michael Lombardi on both AM and FM about Oswald and the various JFK conspiracy theories. He also once jokingly asked Jimmy Kimmel about Kimmel's point of view on the assassination.

References

External links
 Gordon Keith's website
 
 The Ticket's website

American impressionists (entertainers)
American radio personalities
Place of birth missing (living people)
Living people
People from Dallas
Radio personalities from Dallas
Year of birth missing (living people)
Television personalities from Texas